La Futura is the fifteenth studio album by American rock band ZZ Top, released on September 8, 2012. It is the band's first album in nine years, following Mescalero, and peaked at number 5 on the Billboard "Top Rock Albums" chart. La Futura is also the last studio album to feature bassist Dusty Hill before his death on July 28, 2021.

Overview
La Futura was recorded at The Foambox Recordings in Houston, Texas. The album title and album art were unveiled on ZZ Top's homepage on 3 August 2012 at 11:45 a.m. The album contains 10 tracks. 
"We thought long and hard about what this album should be," Gibbons said in a press release. "We wanted to recall the directness of our early stuff but not turn our backs on contemporary technology. The result of this melding of the past and the present is, of course, La Futura."

The album's lead single, "I Gotsta Get Paid", is a cover of "25 Lighters" by Houston hip hop artist DJ DMD. The song "Chartreuse" was inspired by the famous French liqueur, which the band discovered at the 2011 Musilac Music Festival in the French town of Aix-les-Bains.

Release
The first four album tracks —"I Gotsta Get Paid", "Chartreuse", "Consumption" and "Over You"—were first released on 5 June 2012 as an iTunes-only collection titled Texicali, which met with strong sales and glowing reviews. Music Radar summed up the tunes as "fresh, vital roadhouse blues." Another track, "Flyin' High", appropriately made its world premiere in space, when the then-unfinished song was played on board a Soyuz spacecraft during its launch to the International Space Station in June 2011 at the request of the NASA astronaut Mike Fossum, a long-time ZZ Top fan and friend.
Two bonus tracks, titled "Threshold of a Breakdown" and "Drive-By Lover", were released on CDs sold exclusively at Best Buy stores.

Reception
Following its release, the album received mostly positive reviews. William Clark of Guitar International wrote, "La Futura is an impressive return to form for this infamous southern rock trio, and includes some of the best music ZZ Top has ever pushed out." Stephen Thomas Erlewine of Allmusic also praised the album, calling it their best album since Eliminator in 1983, while writing that "ZZ Top are celebrating everything that they've taken for granted for decades – they're embracing the sleazy boogie, the dirty jokes, the locomotive riffs, the saturated blues, the persistent lecherous leer, and by doing so they finally sound like themselves again."

Track listing

Personnel
ZZ Top
Billy Gibbons – vocals, guitar, production
Dusty Hill – bass, keyboards, vocals
Frank Beard – drums

Additional musicians
Joe Hardy – piano, Hammond B3 organ, recording
James Harman – harmonica
Dave Sardy – piano, Hammond B3 organ, mixing

Technical personnel
Cameron Barton – engineering
Ryan Castle – engineering
Pedro Chapouris – photography
Ross Halfin – photography
Jason Lader – recording
Eric Lynn – recording
Vlado Meller – mastering
Gary Moon – recording
Sean Oakley – recording
Rick Rubin – production
Mark Santangelo – mastering
Joe Spix – art direction and design

Charts

Weekly charts

Year-end charts

Certifications

References

2012 albums
Albums produced by Rick Rubin
Albums produced by Billy Gibbons
American Recordings (record label) albums
ZZ Top albums
Albums recorded at Shangri-La (recording studio)